The 1993 Copa América Final was the final match of the 1993 Copa América. It was held on 4 July 1993, in Guayaquil. Argentina won the match 2–1 against Mexico. This was the first time a non-CONMEBOL nation played in a Copa América final.

Managed by Alfio Basile, Argentina won the Copa América for the fourteenth time, defending their title won two years before. Argentina would not win another Copa America until 2021.

Route to the final

Match details

|

References

Final, 1993 Copa America
1992–93 in Mexican football
1992–93 in Argentine football
Argentina national football team matches
Mexico national football team matches
Copa América finals
July 1993 sports events in South America
Sports competitions in Guayaquil
20th century in Guayaquil